The 1980 Royal Bank of Scotland World Women's Curling Championship, the women's world curling championship, was held from 17 to 21 March at the Perth Ice Rink in Perth, Scotland.

Teams

Round-robin standings

Round-robin results

Draw 1

Draw 2

Draw 3

Draw 4

Draw 5

Draw 6

Draw 7

Draw 8

Draw 9

Tiebreaker

Playoffs

Semifinals

Final

External links

World Women's Curling Championship
1980 in women's curling
Sport in Perth, Scotland
1980 in Scottish sport
Women's curling competitions in Scotland
1980 in Scottish women's sport
Royal Bank of Scotland World Women's Curling Championship
International curling competitions hosted by Scotland